State power may refer to:
Police power (United States constitutional law), the capacity of a state to regulate behaviours and enforce order within its territory
 The extroverted concept of power in international relations
 The introverted concept of political power within a society
 The power of a sovereign state to exercise authority within its borders
 Social influence
 Coercion